Sokratis Dioudis (born 3 February 1993) is a Greek professional footballer who plays as a goalkeeper for Ekstraklasa club Zagłębie Lubin and the Greece national team.

Club career

Aris

Dioudis was promoted to the senior Aris team in May 2011 while Sakis Tsiolis was coach. In his first professional season (2011–12), he did not play any match, being behind Michalis Sifakis and Markos Vellidis. In 2012–13 season, being the second-choice goalkeeper of Aris because of the departure with Sifakis, Dioudis started in only the second matchday, against OFI in the Kleanthis Vikelidis Stadium, because of an argue between the first goalkeeper of the squad, Markos Vellidis and the coach Makis Katsavakis. The match ended 0–0.

Club Brugge

On 22 July 2014, Dioudis made a transfer to Belgian giant Club Brugge on a two-years' contract, with an option for an additional season. He became second goalkeeper after the Australian international Mathew Ryan. Aris gets €200,000 with the transfer of their goalie.

Loan to Panionios
On 25 June 2015, following a season in which Dioudis did not play and was only the reserve goalkeeper behind Mathew Ryan, he joined Greek side Panionios on loan for the 2015–16 season, returning to the Superleague Greece. On 28 November 2015, he made his debut with the club in the Superleague in a 2–0 home win against PAS Giannina. On 12 December 2015, in a 1–1 home draw against AEK Athens for the Superleague reached 50 appearances in his professional career in all competitions.
At the end of a successful 2015–16 season, the officials of the club are more than happy with the international goalie's performances and they will do everything in their power to keep him in the club, while Greek giants Olympiacos and Panathinaikos also monitored him for the summer transfer window.

Return to Aris
On 25 March 2016, after solved his contract with Club Brugge, Dioudis returned to Aris on a 3-year contract. He stated that despite receiving offers from Olympiacos, Panathinaikos and AEK Athens he wanted to return to his "home".

On 25 July 2017, after only a year with Aris, the talented Greek goalkeeper will most likely continue his career at Panathinaikos, since the two clubs agreed terms. The Greens will pay an estimated amount of €150,000 in order to complete the purchase of 24-year-old international, who is expected to sign three-season contract with manager Marinos Ouzounidis' team and replace experienced Englishman Luke Steele.

Panathinaikos
On 8 August 2017, Panathinaikos have announced the signing of goalkeeper Sokratis Dioudis, ahead of the 2017–18 season. The 24-year-old international was the sixth player that moves to the Greens this summer. On 25 November 2017, he made his debut with the club in the Superleague, in an away game against Atromitos. At the end of the 2017–18 season, many were worried with him as the first choice this season following the departure of Odysseas Vlachodimos to Benfica, but Dioudis has proved to be an outstanding replacement and credit is given to Panathinaikos' coach Giorgos Donis for turning the player from last season's inconsistent displays to a keeper who commands his area well and makes extraordinary saves.

On 11 November 2018, Dioudis in a 1–1 away derby with rivals Olympiacos suffered a face injury in a strong aerial challenge from Bibras Natcho. The Israeli midfielder earned a yellow card and Panathinaikos were forced to replace the injured Dioudis with Konstantinos Kotsaris. It was a scary moment for Dioudis as he swallowed his tongue. In a touching moment of the derby, the home fans clapped for the injured Panathinaikos keeper as he was carried off in a stretcher.

On 31 January 2020, Dioudis has agreed to extend his Panathinaikos contract through to 2023. Dioudis, has conceded 21 Superleague appearances in the 2019–20 season, gaining seven clean sheets along the way.
At the end of the 2019–20 regular season, the 27-year-old is now considered one of the best goalkeepers in Greece. Dioudis played at the same high level throughout the entire regular season, recording an impressive total of 11 clean sheets while conceding 22 goals in 25 games. The last time when Dioudis conceded more than one goal in a match was in November 2019 as Panathinaikos defeated AEK Athens 3–2.

Zagłębie Lubin
On 27 January 2023, Dioudis signed for Ekstraklasa club Zagłębie Lubin on a contract until the end of the season.

International career

Dioudis was member of Greece U-19. In this level, Dioudis has 9 appearances. The most important matches in his international career are the semi-final and final of 2012 UEFA European Under-19 Football Championship, against England and Spain, making very good appearances.
In October 2012 he was called in the Greece's U-21 team and got 12 appearances.
Two years later, in October 2014, he was called in the Greece National Football Team by Claudio Ranieri without taking any appearances yet.
After a 6-year absence from the national team, on 7 October 2020, he made his first appearance in the friendly 1–2 away loss match against Austria.

Career statistics

Honours

Club Brugge
Belgian Cup: 2014–15

Panathinaikos 
Greek Cup: 2021–22
Greece U19
UEFA European Under-19 Championship runner-up: 2012
Individual
UEFA European Under-19 Championship Team of the Tournament: 2012
Super League Greece–Fantasy League Award Goalkeeper of the Year: 2020–21 
Super League Greece Goalkeeper of the Year: 2020–21
Super League Greece Team of the Year: 2020–21
Panathinaikos Player of the Year: 2020–21

References

External links
 
 
 

1993 births
Living people
Greek footballers
Greek expatriate footballers
Footballers from Thessaloniki
Aris Thessaloniki F.C. players
Club Brugge KV players
Panionios F.C. players
Panathinaikos F.C. players
Zagłębie Lubin players
Super League Greece players
Belgian Pro League players
Football League (Greece) players
Association football goalkeepers
Greece youth international footballers
Greece under-21 international footballers
Greece international footballers
Greek expatriate sportspeople in Belgium
Expatriate footballers in Belgium
Greek expatriate sportspeople in Poland
Expatriate footballers in Poland